Christopher Patrick Gore (born September 5, 1965) is an American speaker and writer on the topic of independent film.

Life and career
Gore was born in Big Rapids, Michigan and attended Kimball High School in Royal Oak, Michigan. Gore is the head writer and the founder of Film Threat magazine, a project dedicated to covering independent and underground film which he started in 1985. He was also the executive editor of Computer Player Magazine from 1993–1995. During this time, he also made his first television appearances on the Jones Computer Network, the network television precursor to ZDTV, as an editorialist and commentator on the state of video games and society.

Gore appeared on the G4 television program Attack of the Show, and had also done a film-related segment on the weekly FX series The X Show. He was also the host and moderator of The New Movie Show with Chris Gore, also on FX, in 2000, where a panel mixed between critics and celebrity guests reviewed movies. G4 then based a recurring gag in an August 2010 episode of Attack of the Show on the murder of Chris Gore, bringing up three potential murderers each - furthering the idea that his movies are horrible and that everyone wanted to kill him.  

Gore co-wrote and produced the independent parody film My Big Fat Independent Movie, a comedy spoof of other indie films featuring Pauly Shore.  His books include The 50 Greatest Movies Never Made, The Ultimate Film Festival Survival Guide and The Complete DVD Book: Designing, Producing and Marketing Your Independent Film on DVD. Gore also co-created Sci-Fi Universe magazine and created the now-defunct Wild Cartoon Kingdom magazine. The latter was used by John Kricfalusi  under the pen name "Thomas Paine" to anonymously criticize Nickelodeon following his September 1992 firing from The Ren & Stimpy Show.  In 2009, Gore signed on to host a reality talk show called Hollywood on the Rocks produced by Mini Movie Channel and distributed by Ovation TV.

In 2016, Gore was interviewed in the Star Wars documentary film The Prequels Strike Back: A Fan's Journey.

Gore currently resides in Los Angeles, California.

References

External links

 Film Threat
 ChrisGore.com
 
 
 Random Interview with Chris Gore
 PodCRASh with That Chris Gore podcast
 An interview with Chris Gore on Notebook on Cities and Culture

1965 births
American YouTubers
American film critics
Television personalities from Los Angeles
People from Big Rapids, Michigan
Writers from Los Angeles
Living people
YouTube critics and reviewers